Maynard Lake, Nova Scotia  is a lake of Halifax Regional Municipality, Nova Scotia, Canada located in Dartmouth.

See also
List of lakes in Nova Scotia

References
 National Resources Canada
 Soil & Water Conservation Society of Metro Halifax

Lakes of Nova Scotia